Yehudit Simhonit (sometimes Simhoni; ; 24 January 1902 – 5 December 1991) was a Zionist activist and politician.

Biography
Simhonit was born in Nahar-Tov, an agricultural settlement in the Kherson Oblast of the Russian Empire (today in Ukraine), and attended an agricultural high school. In 1917 she joined the Zionist Student Youth Federation.

In 1921 she and her husband Mordechai Simhoni made aliyah to Mandatory Palestine, and settled in Nahalal, the newly established first moshav. In 1927 she became a member of the Union of Women Workers. She moved to kibbutz Tel Yosef in 1931, and moved again to Geva in 1943. A member of Mapai, she represented the party in the fourth Assembly of Representatives.

In 1949 she was elected to the first Knesset on the Mapai list. However, she resigned from the Knesset on 5 February 1951 and was replaced by Herzl Berger.

She later worked as a member of the Histadrut's co-ordinating committee and chief cultural and welfare officer of the IDF's Women's Corps. Between 1960 and 1965 she served as head of the Histadrut's International Relations Department.

In 1965 she left Mapai and was a founding member of David Ben-Gurion's new Rafi party, and was amongst its leadership until the party was dissolved in 1968. She died in 1991.

Her son, Major General Asaf Simhoni, was killed in a plane crash at the end of the Sinai War. Her grandson, Avner Simhoni, was killed in 1968 when a mine exploded in the Gulf of Suez during the military operations in the War of Attrition.

Note

References

External links

1902 births
1991 deaths
People from Kherson Governorate
Ukrainian Jews
Zionist activists
Soviet emigrants to Israel
Jews in Mandatory Palestine
Israeli trade unionists
Women members of the Knesset
Members of the Assembly of Representatives (Mandatory Palestine)
Members of the 1st Knesset (1949–1951)
20th-century Israeli Jews
Mapai politicians
Rafi (political party) politicians
20th-century Israeli women politicians
Jewish women politicians
Ukrainian Zionists
People from Nahalal
Kibbutzniks